Mary Jane Warfield Clay (January 20, 1815 – April 29, 1900) was an American socialite, suffragist, abolitionist, and political activist. An early leader in the suffrage movement in Kentucky, she began by forming a suffrage club at her home in 1879. Her experience and success as a farm manager included her acute business sense in the middle of the American Civil War, like selling supplies from her farm to both Union and Confederate forces when they each occupied the Commonwealth. Her most active work in the suffrage movement was to encourage and support her daughters who would become the most well known Kentucky suffragists of the nineteenth and early twentieth centuries.

Early life and family
Mary Jane Warfield Clay was the daughter of Maria Barr and Dr. Elisha Warfield. She grew up on a thoroughbred horse farm, The Meadows, on the northeast side of Lexington, Kentucky and was part of an elite social scene based on slavery and the thoroughbred industry. Her family was socially and politically prominent in Kentucky and in Maryland.

On February 26, 1833, she married the abolitionist orator and politician Cassius Marcellus Clay (1810–1903). According to her daughter, Mary Barr Clay, M.J. Warfield Clay became a strong advocate for emancipation of slaves after marriage, and supported her husband's political career even as he made many enemies and fell victim to pro-slavery mobs. 

 They lived in Lexington from 1838 to 1850 in one of the most elegant residences in the state: the William "Lord" Morton house. In the course of her 45-year marriage, she had ten children,<ref name="Memoriam" six of whom lived to adulthood:
Elisha Warfield Clay (1835–1851)
Green Clay (1837–1883)
Mary Barr Clay (aka Mrs. J. Frank Herrick) (1839–1924)
Sarah "Sallie" Lewis Clay Bennett (1841–1935)
Cassius Marcellus Clay, Jr. (1843–1843)
Cassius Marcellus Clay, Jr. (1845–1857)
Brutus Junius Clay (1847–1932)
Laura Clay (1849–1941)
Flora Clay (1851–1851)
Anne Clay Crenshaw (1859–1945)

Business career
Her husband was captured and taken prisoner during the Mexican War, and M.J. Warfield Clay moved her family from Lexington to live in Madison County at Clermont, Cassius Clay's family home. She began managing the farm in his absence. When President Abraham Lincoln appointed Clay as ambassador to Russia in 1861, she accompanied him there for a short while. She returned to Kentucky in early 1862, against her husband's wishes, living with her four daughters and family slaves on the farm. She was a Unionist while the rest of her family were pro-Confederacy. During the Civil War, a new source of income came from raising and breeding jennies and selling mules to the Union Army.

Clay managed the plantation and slaves while her husband was in Russia. With the profits she gained, she enlarged the mansion Clermont. Originally built in the late 1700s by General Green Clay, she built an Italianate addition with central heating and indoor plumbing, renaming the house White Hall. 

M.J. Warfield Clay left the farm in 1868> soon after her husband finally returned from his ambassadorship in Russia (and a year long stay in New York). The Clays ended their marriage of 45 years with a divorce granted on February 7, 1878, on the grounds of abandonment and with a stipulation that she could not re-marry as long as Cassius Clay lived. Cassius Clay continued to live at the farm with an adopted son after his wife and her children left, and he entertained lavishly. M.J. Warfield Clay and her daughters would return to White Hall to host parties or other social engagements. The proceeds from the farm that his wife had earned also paid for his many debts incurred overseas. 

After the Civil War, M.J. Warfield Clay's sister, Anne Elizabeth Warfield Ryland, offered her shelter at her house in Lexington. She and her younger daughters, including Laura Clay who was attending school in Michigan, lived there until she purchased her own home on North Broadway in 1873.

Leadership in woman suffrage movement

Local petition for National Woman Suffrage Association campaign
Only a year after her divorce from Cassius M. Clay, Mary Jane Warfield Clay with her elder daughters -- Mary Barr Clay (also divorced) and Sallie Clay Bennett -- gathered signatures in Lexington and Richmond for a suffrage petition to be sent to Washington, D.C. This petition was likely in support of the work being done by the National Woman Suffrage Association (NWSA) since Clay described in a letter to her daughters of her admiration of the work led by Matilda Joslyn Gage, editor of the suffrage journal The National Citizen and Ballot Box and former president of the NWSA.

Susan B. Anthony visit, 1879
In October 1879 Susan B. Anthony toured three cities in Kentucky upon the invitation of Mary Barr Clay. During her stay in Madison County, she visited White Hall. Anthony wrote a letter to Mary Barr Clay in 1900 about her memories of that visit 
"...to see your previous mother in her farm home – and then to the proud old mansion where I saw your father in the garden – and he said 'Mary, take Miss Anthony through the house and show it all to her' – which you did. I learned the wonderful heroism of your beautiful mother and also the heroic actions of her daughter Mary ... ever since that visit my love & respect for your dear mother and all of her girls have grown with the years.

First suffrage club in Lexington, Kentucky
On March 7, 1880, M.J. Warfield Clay and her youngest daughter Annie began regular suffrage club meetings in the parlor of their home on North Broadway in Lexington. Many of those who came to her first organizing meeting on March 7 went on to create the Fayette County Equal Rights Association on January 6, 1888. This also served as a launch also for Annie who struck out on her own, writing a regular column on women's rights in the Kentucky Gazette. Annie married a wealthy Virginian, Spottswood Dabney Crenshaw, and in November 1909, she hosted the first meeting of the Equal Suffrage League of Virginia at her home in Richmond, Virginia.

Lucy Stone visit, 1888
In October 1888 Lucy Stone stayed with Mary Jane Warfield Clay in Lexington just before the AWSA convention that took place that year in Cincinnati. Stone invited Laura Clay to give a speech at the convention, and they worked on how the state suffrage association could be revitalized. Soon thereafter a group of activists formed the new Kentucky Equal Rights Association (KERA) on November 21, 1888, and M.J. Warfield Clay was a founding member and financial supporter.

Later life and death
Throughout her life as a divorced woman, she successfully managed her own 350-acre farm in Richmond while living in Lexington. In 1886, Cassius M. Clay published his memoirs which contained malicious descriptions of his former wife. She died April 29, 1900, at her home in Lexington.  She is buried in Section J, Lot 6 of the Lexington Cemetery in Lexington, Kentucky.

References

Further reading

"The Meadows" p 105-109, Elizabeth Murphey Simpson, Blue Grass Houses and Their Traditions. Lexington, Ky.: Transylvania Press, 1932.

1815 births
1900 deaths
American suffragists
People from Lexington, Kentucky
American feminists
American women's rights activists
Women in Kentucky politics
People from Kentucky
American political activists
Mary
Mary